Leonardo Davide Gatto (born 28 April 1992) is an Italian footballer who plays as a midfielder for  club Pro Vercelli.

Club career

Atalanta
Born in Trebisacce, Calabria, Gatto started his career at Lombard side Atalanta B.C. Gatto  was a member of U17 team in 2008–09 season; U18 in 2009–10 and the reserve in 2010–11.

Pisa
In July 2011 the club decided to gift Pisa half of the registration rights in order to farm out the player from the reserve, for a peppercorn of €250. In June 2012 the deal was renewed.

Return to Atalanta and loans
Gatto returned to Atalanta in June 2013 for €75,000.

In the same transfer window he was signed by Lanciano. In July 2014 the loan was renewed.

On 10 July 2015, he was signed by Vicenza in a temporary deal.

On 1 February 2016, Gatto was signed by Salernitana. He picked no.18 from departing Daniele Sciaudone.

In July 2016 Gatto was signed by Ascoli.

Return to Salernitana
On 16 August 2017 Salernitana signed Gatto on a three-year contract.

Entella
On 10 January 2018 Gatto was signed by Entella.

Pro Vercelli
On 24 August 2018 he joined Pro Vercelli on loan.

Triestina
On 8 August 2019 he joined Triestina on loan with an obligation to buy.

Return to Pro Vercelli
On 7 January 2021 he returned to Pro Vercelli on another loan.

International career
Gatto received a U17 call-up in March 2009 He did not enter the final squad for elite qualification nor final tournament. In 2011, he received call-up twice from Italy national under-20 football team. The latter was act as a replacement of Manuel Giandonato.

In the 2012–13 season, Gatto, now an employee of a Lega Pro club, received call-up from Italy U20 Lega Pro team, the feeder team of U21 and dedicated to Lega Pro player (temporary deal excluded). He played the match against Croatia (twice), Russia and Oman. He also played in the unofficial friendly against ACF Fiorentina reserve.

References

External links
 FIGC 
 Football.it Profile 
 Leonardo Gatto at Scoresway

1992 births
Living people
People from Trebisacce
Sportspeople from the Province of Cosenza
Italian footballers
Association football midfielders
Serie B players
Serie C players
Pisa S.C. players
Atalanta B.C. players
S.S. Virtus Lanciano 1924 players
L.R. Vicenza players
U.S. Salernitana 1919 players
Ascoli Calcio 1898 F.C. players
Virtus Entella players
F.C. Pro Vercelli 1892 players
U.S. Triestina Calcio 1918 players
Italy youth international footballers
Italy under-21 international footballers
Footballers from Calabria